1,2-Dimethyldiborane is an organoboron compound with the formula [(CH3)BH2]2.  Structurally, it is related to diborane, but with methyl groups replacing terminal hydrides on each boron. It is the dimer of methylborane, CH3BH2, the simplest alkylborane. 1,2-Dimethyldiborane can exist in a cis- and a trans arrangement. 1,2-Dimethyldiborane is an easily condensed, colorless gas that ignites spontaneously in air.

An isomer of 1,2-dimethyldiborane is 1,1-dimethyldiborane, known as unsymmetrical dimethyldiborane, which has two methyl groups on one boron atom. Other methylated versions of diborane including methyldiborane, trimethyldiborane, tetramethyldiborane. Trimethylborane exists as a monomer.

Preparation
Methylboranes were first prepared by H. I. Schlesinger and A. O. Walker in the 1930s.

In a more modern synthesis, 1,2-dimethyldiborane is produced by treating lithium methylborohydride with hydrogen chloride:
2 LiCH3BH3 + 2 HCl  →  (CH3BH2)2 + 2 H2 + 2 LiCl
Instead of hydrogen chloride, methyl iodide or trimethylsilyl chloride can be used.

Lithium methylborohydride can be made by treating methylboronic esters with lithium aluminium hydride.

Miscellaneous routes
Methylboranes arise the reaction of diborane and trimethylborane.  This reaction produces 1-methyldiborane, 1,1-dimethyldiborane, 1,1,2-trimethyldiborane, and 1,1,2,2-tetramethyldiborane. By treating monomethyldiborane with ether, dimethyl ether borane (CH3)2O.BH3 leaving methylborane which rapidly dimerises to 1,2-dimethyldiborane. The reaction is complex.

Tetramethyl lead reacts with diborane to give a range of methyl-substituted diboranes, ending up at trimethylborane, but including 1,1-dimethyldiborane, and trimethyldiborane. Other products are hydrogen gas and lead metal.

Other methods to form methyldiboranes include treating hydrogen with trimethylborane between 80 and 200 °C under pressure, or treating a metal borohydride with trimethylborane in the presence of hydrogen chloride, aluminium chloride or boron trichloride. If the borohydride is sodium borohydride, then methane is a side product.  If the metal is lithium, then no methane is produced. dimethylchloroborane and methyldichloroborane are also produced as gaseous products.

When Cp2Zr(CH3)2 reacts with diborane, a borohydro group inserts into the zirconium-carbon bond, and methyl diboranes are produced.

In ether dimethylcalcium reacts with diborane to produce dimethyldiborane and calcium borohydride:
Ca(CH3)2 + 2 B2H6 → Ca(BH4)2 + B2H4(CH3)2

1,2-Dimethyldiborane is produced by the room temperature disproportionation of trimethyldiborane.

Physical and spectroscopic properties
cis-1,2-Dimethyldiborane melts at −132.5 °C; trans-1,2-dimethyldiborane melts at −102 °C. The cis-1,2-dimethyldiborane molecule has point group Cs. A trans-1,2-dimethyldiborane molecule has point group C2. Unsymmetrical dimethyldiborane melts at −150.2 °C. Vapour pressure is approximated by Log P = 7.363−(1212/T). The vapour pressure for the symmetrical isomer is given by Log P = 7.523−(1290/T).

Gas chromatography can be used to determine the amounts of the methyl boranes in a mixture.  The order of elution are: diborane, monomethyldiborane, trimethylborane, 1,1-dimethyldiborane, 1,2-dimethyldiborane, trimethyldiborane, and last tetramethyldiborane.

The nuclear resonance shift for the bridge hydrogen is 9.55 ppm for the unsymmetrical isomer and 9.73 ppm for the symmetrical isomers, compared to 10.49 for diborane.

Reactions
Methylborane shows little tendency to disproportionate (redistribute) at room temperature.  It reacts stepwise with alkenes to produce mono and dialkylmethylboranes.  More methylated boranes are less stable.

1,2-Dimethyldiborane slowly converts to 1,1-dimethyldiborane.

Methylborane hydrolyzes to methylboronic acid:
(MeBH2)2  +  4 H2O  →   CH3B(OH)2  + 4 H2
Symmetrical dimethyldiborane reacts with trimethylamine to yield a solid adduct trimethylamine-methylborane (CH3)3N·BH2CH3.

When dimethyldiborane is combined with ammonia and heated, B-methyl borazoles are produced.  These borazoles can have one, two or three methyl groups substituted on the boron atoms.

Under normal conditions dimethyldiborane does not react with hydrogen.

Related species
Lithium trihydromethylborate [CH3BH3]−.
Isomers of diethyldiborane can be produced by analogous methods.
1,2- 2,2- and 2,4-dimethyltetraborane, 1,2-dimethylpentaborane 2,3-dimethylpentaborane, 4,5-dimethylhexaborane, and 5,6- 6,8- 6,9-dimethyldecaborane.

References

Extra reading

 mass spectroscopy
 charge distribution and atom location calculations

Alkylboranes